O Dia que Durou 21 Anos (The Day That Lasted 21 Years) is a Brazilian documentary film directed by Camilo Tavares that shows the influence of the U.S. government in the 1964 Brazilian coup d'état. Original White House tapes with John F. Kennedy and Lyndon Johnson as well as CIA Top Secret documents reveal how the US government planned to overthrow Brazilian elected president João Goulart. The film has won three awards in international festivals cinemas, two of these in the United States and one in France.

Synopsis
The 1964 Brazilian coup d'état (Portuguese: Golpe de estado no Brasil em 1964 or, more colloquially, Golpe de 64) on March 31, 1964, culminated in the overthrow of Brazilian elected President João Goulart by the Armed Forces. On April 1, 1964, the United States expressed its support to the new military regime.

The documentary explores the American involvement in the coup that culminated in a brutal dictatorship that would last for the next 21 years.

The US ambassador at the time, Lincoln Gordon, and the military attaché, Colonel Vernon A. Walters, kept in constant contact with President Lyndon B. Johnson as the crisis progressed.

Awards
St Tropez International Film Festival (France), Best Foreign Documentary: The Day That Lasted 21 Years - Camilo Tavares
22° Arizona International Film Festival (USA), Special Jury Award: The Day That Lasted 21 Years - Camilo Tavares
29° Long Island Film Festival (USA), Long Island Special Jury Award: The Day That Lasted 21 Years - Camilo Tavares

Critical reception

 "Excellent, gripping story" - The Hollywood Reporter - USA
 "Revelator deserves fest" - Variety - USA
 "Fascinating" – ScreenDaily - USA "A gem" - Luiz Carlos Merten - Estado
 "A real movie" - Nelson Pereira dos Santos - Filmmaker
 "Hard-hitting, helps to build the country's history" – Luis Nassif - Carta Maior

See also
 Alliance for Progress
 Hidden Terrors
 Forced disappearance
 1973 Chilean coup d'état
 Operation Condor

External links
 http://www.hollywoodreporter.com/review/day-lasted-21-years-o-377451
 O Dia que Durou 21 Anos / “The day that lasted 21 years" film trailer at YouTube

References

Brazilian documentary films
Documentary films about historical events
Films about Brazilian military dictatorship
Documentary films about Brazilian politics
Documentary films about Latin American military dictatorships
Brazil–United States relations